Sardar Bahadur Ishar Singh VC, OBI (30 December 1895 – 2 December 1963) was a soldier in the British Indian Army and a recipient of the Victoria Cross, the highest award for gallantry in the face of the enemy that can be awarded to British and Commonwealth forces. Born at Nainwa, he was the first Sikh to receive the Victoria Cross.

Victoria Cross
He was 25 years old, and a sepoy in the 28th Punjabis, Indian Army during the Waziristan Campaign when, on 10 April 1921, near Haidari Kach he undertook the actions which led his senior officer, Captain Bernard Oddie, to recommend him for the award of a VC. The citation was published in a supplement to the London Gazette of 25 November 1921:

He later achieved the rank of captain, and served in the Second World War. In addition to the Victoria Cross, he was awarded the prestigious Order of British India, First Class, which carried with it the title of "Sardar Bahadur."

His medal is held in the collection of Lord Ashcroft.

References

Footnotes

Bibliography

External links
Ishar Singh

Sikh warriors
Punjabi people
People from Bundi district
1890s births
1963 deaths
Indian recipients of the Victoria Cross
British Indian Army officers
British military personnel of the Waziristan Campaign
Indian Army personnel of World War I
Indian Army personnel of World War II
Sardar Bahadurs